Samsung Galaxy Core GT-I8260 single sim card slot model and Samsung Galaxy Core GT-I8262 dual sim card variant are smartphone manufactured by Samsung Electronics that runs on the open source Android 4.1.2 Jelly Bean operating system. Announced by Samsung in early May 2013, the Dual-SIM model has been released in mid-to-late May 2013, and the single-SIM version for July 2013.

Features

The device has similar design and specs to the Samsung Galaxy S III. This phone also has S Voice, which is a feature found on high-end Samsung Galaxy devices. A key selling point of the device is its dual sim capability.

Model variants

Galaxy Core Plus (SM-G350) 

This version of Samsung Galaxy Core is available only in certain European countries. It also shares same model codes as Galaxy Trend 3, Galaxy Star 2 Plus or Galaxy Star Advance (SM-G350L and G350M) Some models have 3MP camera such as SM-G350E. See also the Samsung Galaxy Core Prime which is a more upgraded version, which is newer and has higher specifications.

Galaxy Core Safe (SHW-M580D)



Galaxy Trend 3 (SM-G3502) 
Dual SIM version for China, but without flash. Still has a camera though.

Galaxy Core 4G (SM-G386F) 
China Mobile's TD-LTE Model.

Galaxy Style Duos (GT-I8260) 
Single sim card slot.

Galaxy Style Duos (GT-I8262) 
Dual sim card slots.

Galaxy Style Duos (GT-I8262D)

Galaxy Style (SCH-I829)



Galaxy Core Prime (SM-G360P) 
Released 2014, November; GSM, LTE (Cat4), HSPA, Single SIM (Duos Dual SIM).
Quad-core 1.2 GHz Cortex-A53.

See also
 Samsung Galaxy Ace
 Samsung Galaxy SII
 Galaxy Nexus
 Samsung Galaxy Core Prime

References

Galaxy Core
Samsung smartphones
Android (operating system) devices
Mobile phones introduced in 2013